Selçuk University is a state-owned higher educational institution which was founded 1975 in Konya, Turkey. It is one of the largest universities in Turkey with a student body of 63,000 of which 2,200 are foreign students from 105 countries.

History
Selçuk University began education in the academic year of 1976–1977 with two faculties: the Faculty of Science and the Faculty of Literature. It has significantly grown since to become one of the largest and highest-ranked universities in Turkey.

1955 - 1962
A bill to found a university in Konya was prepared in 1955 by the Grand National Assembly of Turkey. Despite gaining a majority of signatures, the bill failed to pass the Ministry of National Education (MEB).

1962 - 1977
In 1962, the Selçuk Education Institute and the Higher Islamic Institute were opened under the MEB. This was the first significant step towards founding a university in Konya, and was furthered with the creation of the Association for the Founding and Sustenance of the University in 1968. The efforts of this association created the core of the present Engineering-Architecture faculty: the Engineering-Architecture college. The college lacked its own building, classes and funding but began teaching in the 1970–1971 academic year in a building belonging to the General Directorate of Child Services. It was titled the Konya State Academy of Architecture and Engineering as per Article 9 of Law No. 1418.

Selçuk university along with four others were founded in 1975 with the passing of the law entitled Law pertaining to the founding of 4 universities, numbered 1873 which was published in the Official Gazette of the Republic of Turkey. The university began operating in the 1976–1977 academic year, with two faculties (Faculty of Science and the Faculty of Literature), 7 subjects, 327 students and 2 permanent lecturers.

Present Day
In 2018, a law was passed for the founding of 20 new universities in Turkey. As part of this, 13 existing universities were to have some of their faculties split to create new universities. Konya Technical University (previously Konya University) was established through this, from the Engineering, Architecture, faculties and the Technical Sciences Vocational College that belonged to Selçuk University.

Student life

Social activities
At the beginning of each academic year, the university arranges a Welcome Festival (Hoş Geldiniz Şenliği). Every May, the university hosts a six-day Spring Festival (Bahar Şenliği) that is arranged to coincide with the Commemoration of Atatürk, Youth and Sports Day. A sports festival is also organized in May (Spor Şenlikleri). A new year concert is held at the end of December (Yeni Yıl Konseri).

The Gökkuşağı shopping center within the campus hosts restaurants, bookstores, supermarkets among other amenities.

Student societies
The university hosts 22 sports teams and 148 student communities & clubs.

Sports
The university has an Olympic-size swimming pool, a football field with roofed bleachers, 3 gymnasiums, 2 basketball courts, and 2 tennis courts.

Accommodation
The university's Alaaddin Keykubat campus hosts a six block Ataturk dormitory along with KYK-affiliated Alaaddin and Cumhuriyet student dormitories. The university also has a guesthouse and ERASMUS student dormitory.

Organization

Selçuk University consists of 23 faculties, 1 State Conservatory, 22 vocational schools and Application Centers. Former faculties in Niğde, Karaman and Aksaray were separated from it in the 2000s.

Selçuk University has nearly 63,000 students and a population of approximately 2,700 academicians and lecturers. Of the student population, 2186 are international students from 105 countries.

Faculties
 Faculty of Agriculture
 Faculty of Art and Design
 Beyşehir Faculty of Business Administration
 Faculty of Communication
 Faculty of Dentistry
 Faculty of Economics and Administrative Sciences
 Faculty of Education
 Ereğli Faculty of Education
 Faculty of Engineering
 Faculty of Architecture
 Seydişehir Faculty of Engineering
 Faculty of Fine Arts
 Faculty of Law
 Meram Faculty of Medicine
 Selçuklu Faculty of Medicine
 Faculty of Science
 Faculty of Technical Education
 Faculty of Technology
 Faculty of Theology
 Faculty of Veterinary
 Faculty of Vocational Education

Schools
 School of Physical Education and Sports
 Akşehir Kadir Yallagöz School of Health
 School of Tourism and Hotel Management, which includes a practice hotel run by the Department of Tourism
 Beyşehir Ali Akkanat School of Tourism and Hotel Management
 School of Foreign Languages

Graduate schools
 Graduate school of Education Sciences
 Graduate school of Health Sciences
 Graduate school of Science
 Graduate school of Social Sciences
 Graduate school of Turkish Studies

President departments
 Department of Atatürk Principles and Revolution History
 Department of Turkish Language

Conservatories
 Dilek Sabanci State Conservatory

University hospitals 
 Faculty of Medicine Hospital, a 934-bed teaching hospital
 Dental Hospital
 Veterinary Hospital

Research and application centers
 Accident Investigation, Prevention and Application Center
 Applied Mathematics Research and Application Center
 Atatürk Principles and Revolution History Research and Application Center
 Biofuels Research and Application Center
 Computer Sciences Research and Application Center
 Environmental Problems Research and Application Center
 ESWL and Stone Disease Research and Application Center
 Experimental Medicine Research and Application Center
 Family Research and Application Center
 Foreign Languages Research and Application Center
 Imam Maturidi Application and Research Center
 Konya History Research Center
 Manufacturing Systems Automation and Computer-Aided Design, Manufacturing, Research and Application Center
 Mevlana Research and Application Center
 Mushroom Research and Application Center
 Seljuks Research and Application Center
 Selcuk University Fisheries Research and Application Center
 Selcuk University Continuing Education Application and Research Center
 Research Center of Strategic Studies
 Turkish Craft Research and Application Center
 Turkish Folk Culture Research and Application Center

Additional units
 Selçuk University Computer Center (BİLMER)
 Selcuk University Department of Geological Engineering
 Selcuk University Central Library
 Selcuk University Technology Development Zone (Konya Teknokent)
 Continuing Education Application  Center (SEM)

Rectors

Notable people
 Bekir Bozdağ, Minister of Justice
 Murat Kurum, Minister of Environment, Urbanisation and Climate Change
 İlhan Yerlikaya, former president of the Radio and Television Supreme Council
 Ismail Reisli, Associate Professor and Associate Chief Physician at Meram School of Medicine.  Helped to identify CD19 Deficiency Syndrome.
 Metin Şahin, Assistant professor - European Taekwondo champion and current president of Turkey Taekwondo Federation
 Ahmet Kural, Actor

See also
Education in Turkey
List of universities in Turkey
Konya
Student Selection and Placement System

References

External links

 More information about Selçuk University
 Selcuk University Catalog
 Selcuk University Students Platform

 
Educational institutions established in 1975
1975 establishments in Turkey